Truth & Justice is a podcast by Bob Ruff, a former fire chief. Its focus is people who Ruff believes have been wrongfully convicted of crimes. It started as Ruff's investigation into the killing of Hae Min Lee, the subject of the first season of the popular podcast Serial. Ruff says its mission is to "uncover the truth and seek justice for the victims and wrongfully convicted alike."

Its investigation led to the innocence project of Texas taking up the case and Ed Ates was paroled in 2018.  https://innocencetexas.org/cases/ed-ates/  Ed Ates, who was convicted of murder in Smith County, Texas. None of the collected blood, hair, semen or fingerprints matched Ates, who continues to insist that he is innocent.

The podcast was started as a response to Serial investigation Lee's killing and Adnan Syed's subsequent murder conviction (since vacated).

As of November 2018, the podcast was investigating the case of Sandra Melgar, who was convicted of murdering her husband Jaime Melgar. The police were suspicious of Melgar, who suffers from epilepsy, because she told the police she could not remember what had happened. Jaime Melgar was stabbed to death after a struggle, and Melgar was found tied up at the scene. Her hands were not injured. Ruff believes Melgar was telling the truth and is innocent.

In April 2019, the podcast offered a $20,000 reward for the arrest and conviction of the killer of Jaime Melgar.

The podcast is crowdsourced and much of the investigation is performed by listeners.

See also

 Rabia Chaudry

References

External links
 

Crime podcasts
Investigative journalism
2015 podcast debuts
Audio podcasts
Patreon creators
American podcasts